Like Comedy is the ninth studio album from Scottish band The Proclaimers, released in 2012 on Cooking Vinyl. The album reached number 31 on the UK charts. The album's first single was "Spinning Around in the Air".

Content and style

Musical style 
Like Comedy has been categorised as a blue-eyed soul album, stylistically. The Scotsman described the record as "consistent collection of unvarnished Celtic soul".

Lyrics and themes 
Lyrics on Like Comedy dealt chiefly with themes of love and relationships, as well as those of ageing, language and belief systems. The Scotsman described the songwriting on the album as "thoughtful and witty".

Critical reception 

Like Comedy received an aggregate score from Metacritic of 71/100, suggesting "generally favorable reviews", based on 6 critics. In a review by Andy Gill, The Independent professed the album to feature "their ebullient charm in large dollops" and described the song "Whatever You've Got" to share "the rolling, singalong appeal" of the duo's previous hits.

Describing Like Comedy, Irish Independent opined that the blue-eyed soul of the band "still shines bright, especially on the tender ballads".

Track listing

Personnel
The Proclaimers
 Craig Reid – vocals
 Charlie Reid – acoustic guitar and vocals

Additional musicians
 Jerry Crozier Cole – acoustic and electric guitars
 Steve Evans – electric and bass guitars, piano and drums
 Clive Jenner – drums
 Beth Porter – cello
 Katie Stone Lonergan – violin
 Zac Ware – mandolin
 David Macnab – banjo
 Conor Breen – double bass

Production
 Steve Evans – producer, string arrangements and additional programming
 Tom Dalgety – additional programming
 Lewis MacDonald – cover design

References

The Proclaimers albums
2012 albums
Cooking Vinyl albums